The Order of the Ermine (L’Ordre de l’Hermine) was a chivalric order created in 1464 by king Ferdinand I of Naples. The motto was "Malo mori quam foedari" ("I would rather die than be dishonored").

Recipients
 Federico da Montefeltro, Duke of Urbino
 Charles the Bold, Duke of Burgundy
 Giulio Antonio Acquaviva, 1478
 Ludovico Sforza, Duke of Milan, since 1488

Sources
 Gustav Adolph Ackermann,  Ordensbuch, Sämtlicher in Europa blühender und erloschener Orden und Ehrenzeichen. Annaberg, 1855, p 254 n° 149. "Orden vom Hermelin"

References

Orders of chivalry